HD 85390 is a star with an exoplanet companion in the southern constellation of Vela. It was given the proper name Natasha by Zambia during the 100th anniversary of the IAU. Natasha means "thank you" in many languages of Zambia. This star is too faint to be seen with the naked eye, having an apparent visual magnitude of 8.54. It is located at a distance of 109 light years from the Sun based on parallax, and is drifting further away with a radial velocity of 33 km/s.

The stellar classification of HD 85390 is K1.5V, showing this to be a K-type main-sequence star. It is an older star with age estimates of 7–9 billion years, and is not considered chromospherically active. The star is spinning with a projected rotational velocity of 2 km/s. It is smaller, cooler, dimmer, and less massive than the Sun, but the metallicity is near solar.

Planetary system
The planet b was detected by the radial velocity method in 2011. An additional planet in the system was suspected since 2013, only to be refuted in 2019.

References

K-type main-sequence stars
Planetary systems with one confirmed planet

Vela (constellation)
Durchmusterung objects
085390
048235
Natasha
J09500249-4947250